Minister of Internal Affairs of Georgia is the head of the Ministry of Internal Affairs of Georgia. The position is equivalent to the interior minister in other countries, like the Home Secretary in the United Kingdom, the Minister of Public Safety in Canada, or similar to a combination of the Attorney General and the Secretary of Homeland Security in the United States.

Leaders

Minister of Internal Affairs of the Democratic Republic of Georgia
 Noe Ramishvili, May 26, 1918 – March 17, 1921

People's Commissars of Internal Affairs of the SSR of Georgia
 David Kiladze, July 15 – November 11, 1934
 Sergo Goglidze, November 11, 1934 – November 14, 1938
 Avksenti Rapava, November 19, 1938 – February 26, 1941
 Varlam Kakuchaia, February 26 – July 31, 1941
 Avksenti Rapava, July 31, 1941 – May 7, 1943
 Grigori Karanadze, May 7, 1943 – April 8, 1952
 Vakhtang Loladze, May 29, 1952 – March 16, 1953
 aleksander Kochlavashvili, March 16–21, 1953
 Varlam Kakuchaia, March 21 – April 10, 1953
 Vladimer Dekanozov, April 10 – June 30, 1953
 Aleksi Inauri, 20 Jule 1953 – March 26, 1954
 Vladimer Djandjgava, May 1954 – December 1958
 Ivan Garibashvili, November 18, 1958 – August 16, 1961
 Otar Kavtaradze, August 16, 1961 – May 22, 1965
 Eduard Shevardnadze, May 22, 1965 – 1972
 Konstantin Ketiladze, August 18, 1972 – May 26, 1979
 Guram Gvetadze, May 26, 1979 – January 21, 1986
 Shota Gorgodze, January 22, 1986 – November 23, 1990

Ministers of Internal Affairs of the Republic of Georgia
 Dilar Khabuliani, November 23, 1990 – December 1991
 David Salaridze, December 1991 – January 1992 
 Roman Gventsadze, January 1992 – November 1992
 Temur Khachishvili, November 1992 – September 1993
 Eduard Shevardnadze, September 1993 – March 31, 1994
 Shota Kviraia, March 31, 1994 – September 2, 1995
 Kakha Targamadze, September 2, 1995 – 2001
 Koba Narchemashvili, November 1, 2001 – November 25, 2003

Ministers of Internal Affairs of Georgia
 Giorgi Baramidze, November 2003 – June 7, 2004
 Irakli Okruashvili, June 7, 2004 – December 17, 2004
 Ivane Merabishvili, December 18, 2004 – July 4, 2012 
 Bachana Akhalaia, July 4, 2012 – September 20, 2012
 Ekaterine Zguladze, September 20, 2012 – October 25, 2012   
 Irakli Gharibashvili, October 25, 2012 – November 20, 2013
 Aleksandre Chikaidze, November 20, 2013 – January 23, 2015
 Vakhtang Gomelauri, January 26, 2015 – August 3, 2015
 Giorgi Mghebrishvili, August 3, 2015 – November 13, 2017
 Giorgi Gakharia, November 13, 2017 – September 8, 2019
 Vakhtang Gomelauri, September 8, 2019 – present

References 

Interior ministers of Georgia
Georgia
Georgia
.I